Hoplojana is a genus of moths in the family Eupterotidae.

Species
Hoplojana indecisa Aurivillius, 1901
Hoplojana politzari Basquin, 2013
Hoplojana purpurata Wichgraf, 1921
Hoplojana watsoni (Berger, 1980)
Hoplojana zernyi Gschwandner, 1923

Former species
Hoplojana abyssinica Rothschild, 1917
Hoplojana anaemica Hampson, 1910
Hoplojana distincta Rothschild, 1917
Hoplojana insignifica Rothschild, 1917
Hoplojana nigrorufa Berger, 1980
Hoplojana overlaeti Berger, 1980
Hoplojana rhodoptera Gerstaecker, 1871
Hoplojana roseobrunnea Rothschild, 1917
Hoplojana rustica Strand, 1911
Hoplojana soricis Rothschild, 1917
Hoplojana tripunctata Aurivillius, 1897

References

 , 2011: Démembrement et réorganisation des genres Jana Herrich-Schäffer, 1854 et Hoplojana Aurivillius, 1901 (Lepidoptera: Eupterotidae). Lambillionea 111 (3) Tomé 1: 211–218.

Janinae